Apart from India, where the vast majority (1.12 billion) of the world's 1.3 billion Hindu population lives, Hindu Temples are found across the world, on every continent. In the Indian Subcontinent, thousands of modern and historic temples are spread across Nepal, Sri Lanka, Bangladesh and Pakistan. Outside the region, the oldest temples can be found in Cambodia, Thailand, Myanmar, Malaysia and Indonesia where ancient seafaring empires like the Chola Empire and Vijayanagara Empire spread their dominions.

In the early modern period, Fiji, Guyana, Kenya, Malaysia, Mauritius, Réunion, Myanmar, Seychelles, Singapore, South Africa, Suriname, Tanzania, Trinidad and Tobago and Uganda, have seen many temples being built, as the Indian Diaspora settled across these areas over the past 250–300 years.

Over the past 70 years, immigration to western nations have led to the construction of temples for the Hindu communities in these countries.

Afghanistan

Australia

Bangladesh

Botswana

Cambodia

Canada

Fiji Islands
 Sri Siva Subramaniya temple, Nadi

Ghana

 Ghana Hindu Monastery, Accra

Germany

Guyana
 Tain Hindu Mandir

Indonesia

Iran

 Bandar Abbas Vishnu Temple

Japan

Kenya

 BAPS Shri Swaminarayan Mandir Nairobi
 Shri Swaminarayan Mandir, Nairobi (EASS)

Laos
 Vat Phou - ruined Khmer temple, southern Laos (was converted to a Buddhist Monastery in the 13th-century)

Macedonia

Malaysia

Mauritius

 Ganga Talao
 Maheshwarnath Mandir, Triolet

Myanmar

 Nathlaung Kyaung Temple – dedicated to Vishnu, Bagan (formerly Pagan), Mandalay Region
 Shri Kali Temple (Tamil temple), Yangon

Nepal

Nigeria

Netherlands

New Zealand

Pakistan

Philippines

Shiv Mandir
1166 Apacible St, Paco, Manila, Metro Manila, Philippines

Sri Sidh Baba Balak Nath Hindu Temple
1607, 12 Market Ave, San Miguel, Pasig, 1602 Metro Manila, Philippines

Hindu Temple
HXJR+3P6, Escoda St, Paco, Manila, Metro Manila, Philippines

Cebu Indian Hindu Temple
48, F. Gochan Street, Cebu City, 6000 Cebu, Philippines

Baguio Hindu Temple
CH9M+69Q, Avelino, Baguio, Benguet, Philippines

Shiva Mandir
F2C4+WM6, San Isidro, Parañaque, 1700 Metro Manila, Philippines

Poland

Singapore

South Africa
 Mariamman Temple
 Madhya Kailash Temple Midrand, 52 Stag Road Glen Austin EXT 3 Midrand
Narainsamy Temple, Durban

South Korea

 Himalayan Meditation and Yoga Sadhana Mandir, Seocho, Seoul
 Sri Lakshmi Narayanan Temple, Seoul
 Sri Radha Shyamasundar Mandir - central Seoul
 Sri Sri Radha Krishna temple - ISKCON movement

Sri Lanka

 Kataragama temple
 Nallur Kandaswamy temple
 Pancha Ishwarams

Suriname

 Arya Diwaker

Switzerland

 Sri Sivasubramaniar Temple

Tanzania

Thailand

Bangkok

 Mariamman Temple - Bangkok, Silom Road
 Vishnu Temple,Sathon (วัดวิษณุ) 
 Erawan Shrine
 Phra Indra Shrine 
 Lakshmi Shrine
 Lord Balaji temple, Nong Chok

Chiang Rai
 Wat Phra Mae Si Maha Umathew (วัดพระแม่ศรีมหาอุมาเทวี)
 Thep Monthian Hindu Temple
 Dev Mandir Chiang Mai
 Pikanesuan Devalai Chiangmai 
 Ganesha Temple Sanpantong
 Lampang
 Ganesha Nakorn Thoen-Wat Khaek (พระพิฆเนศนครเถิน-วัดแขกลำปาง)

 Nakhon Si Thammarat
 Hor Phra Isuan
 Ho Phra Narai Shrine

 Pathum Thani 
 Kattu Mariamman Temple (เทวสถานพระศรีนาคาทุรคาเทวี/ஸ்ரீ நாக துர்கா தேவி கோவில்)

 Pattaya
 The Temple of the Goddess Kali at Pattaya (วิหารพระแม่กาลี ณ พัทยา)
 Shree Jyotirlingeshwasher Shiva Dhaam (เทวาลัยพระศิวะเทพ พัทย/Shiv Temple Pattaya) 
 ISKCON Pattaya 

 Phuket
 Phra Phrom Square, Rawai, Mueang Phuket District, Phuket (ลานพระพรหม)
 ISKCON Phuket, Phuket 
 Phuket Thandayudapani Murugan Temple (பூகெட் தண்டாயுதபாணி முருகன் கோவில்/วมูลนิธิภูเก็ตตันดายูดาปานี)
 Shree Bhagawat Dhaam Sanatan Mandir, Pa Tong, Phuket (Phuket Sivan Temple/ศรี ภควัต ธัม ศานาตัน มัณฑีร์/श्री भागवत धाम सनातन मंदिर)

 Songkhla
 Dannok Ganesh Temple, Dannok, Sadao (พระพิฆเนศด่านนอก/ தன்னோக் விநாயகர் கோவில் )
 Four Face Buddha (Bucha), Asean Night Bazar, Hat Yai (พระพรหม)

 Surat Thani
 Sri Ganesha Temple, Phunphin, Surat Thani (เทวสถานศรีฆเนศวร)
Khmer temples
see :Category:Angkorian sites in Thailand

 Mueang Sing historical park
 Muang Tum
 Phanom Rung historical park
 Phimai historical park - important Khmer temples, Phimai, Nakhon Ratchasima province
 Prang Sam Yot - converted to a Buddhist shrine, Lopburi, Lopburi Province
 Phra That Dum
 Phra That Narai Cheng Weng
 Phra That Phu Pek
 Prasat Sikhoraphum
 Sdok Kok Thom

Trinidad and Tobago

Uganda

United Arab Emirates

 Hindu Temple, Dubai, Shiva Mandir and Sri Krishna Mandir and Gurudwara - near Dubai Museum, Bur Dubai, Dubai.

BAPS Abu Dhabi Mandir

United Kingdom

United States

 Radha Madhav Dham

Vietnam

 Mariamman Temple - Ho Chi Minh City
 Mỹ Sơn - Duy Phú, Central Vietnam
 Po Klong Garai - n. Phan Rang, southern Vietnam
 Po Nagar-  n. Nha Trang, southern Vietnam

See also
 Lists of Hindu temples by country
 List of Buddhist temples
 List of cathedrals
 List of mosques
 Swaminarayan temples

References

External links
Hindu Temples outside of India
ISKCON Centers Around the World
All Hindu Temples Outside India on a Google Map - Global Hindu Temple Directory
Statues of Hindu God In Temple

Outside India
 
Hinduism-related lists